Bashir Ahmed (1 April 1924 – 4 January 2013) was an Indian cricketer. He played two first-class matches for United Provinces between 1945 and 1947.

References

External links
 

1924 births
2013 deaths
Indian cricketers
United Provinces cricketers
Place of birth missing